The Bronx Walk of Fame is a 23-block corridor along the Grand Concourse, one of the main boulevards in the Bronx, the northernmost borough of New York City, with street signs honoring people who have lived in the borough and had worthy accomplishments. Individuals selected for honor frequently have been celebrities in artistic fields, but there also have been relative "unknowns" who have quietly made their mark on society, and several groups have also been honored. Elections to the Bronx Walk of Fame are held annually.

History
Fernando Ferrer, borough president of the Bronx from 1987 to 2001, conceived the idea for the Bronx Walk of Fame in 1997 to honor people who had ties to The Bronx and made significant contributions to society.

The initial induction ceremony, on June 1, 1997, coincided with the conclusion of the 25th Bronx Week, an annual spring celebration of street festivals and concerts throughout the Bronx, a parade, and the Bronx Ball, a black-tie gala that includes a ceremony for the inductees.  The inductees' names were inscribed on street signs mounted on lampposts on the Grand Concourse from East 161st Street to East 158th Street, in front of the Bronx County Courthouse, each bearing the name of an honoree. The original design included the honoree's name in the center of the sign, the words "The Bronx" above and "Walk of Fame" below, and stylized images of the Bronx County Courthouse on the left and a pizza shop on the right.

In 2007, the signs were replaced with a new design featuring a different typeface, a redrawn courthouse, and the pizza shop replaced by an Art Deco building meant to evoke the architectural style of many of the apartment buildings on the Grand Concourse. As more honorees have been added over the years, the signs have been placed further southward, extending past East 149th Street, beyond which there are much fewer pedestrians, and reaching the southern end of the Grand Concourse at East 138th Street.

In 2019, a five-year project was announced to reconstitute the walk along the Grand Concourse starting at East 149th Street near Hostos Community College and the main Bronx Post Office, extending to 167th Street near the Bronx Museum of the Arts. The new alignment would give an opportunity to group inductees by similar accomplishments, install new plaques, allow more pedestrians to have a better opportunity to see the plaques, and create a digital map.

Election process

Nominations can be made by anybody in the community, and selections are determined by a committee consisting of the Bronx borough president, The Bronx Tourism Council, and The Bronx Overall Economic Development Corporation. Inductees' names are announced prior to Bronx Week.  Their names are inscribed on oversized street signs that are unveiled in front of the Bronx County Courthouse located on the Grand Concourse between East 158th and 161st Streets, where they remain on lampposts for one year before being transferred to different locations along the Grand Concourse to make room for the next group of honorees.

The Bronx Walk of Fame is maintained by the Bronx Tourism Council. Since 2012, the number of inductees has been limited to five per year. In 2020, Bronx Week celebrations and the Walk of Fame selections were cancelled because of the COVID-19 epidemic, which hit New York City particularly hard that spring.

List of honorees
The following people have been honored with election.

* Posthumous honoree

External links
 Bronx Walk of Fame website

References

Halls of fame in New York (state)
1997 establishments in New York City
Walks of fame
Halls of fame in New York City
Sculpture galleries in the United States
Tourist attractions in the Bronx